Year 269 (CCLXIX) was a common year starting on Friday (link will display the full calendar) of the Julian calendar. At the time, it was known as the Year of the Consulship of Claudius and Paternus (or, less frequently, year 1022 Ab urbe condita). The denomination 269 for this year has been used since the early medieval period, when the Anno Domini calendar era became the prevalent method in Europe for naming years.

Events 
 By place 
 Roman Empire 
 Second Gothic invasion: The Goths and other German tribes attack Bosphorean towns on the coast of the Black Sea. Some 2,000 ships and 320,000 men from the Danube enter Roman territory. Emperor Claudius II defeats the invaders and receives the title Gothicus for his triumph. Many of the prisoners will serve in the Roman legions and settle in vacant lands in the Danubian provinces.
 Claudius II travels to Sirmium and prepares a war against the Vandals, who raid Pannonia.  
 The Heruli capture Athens and raid the Aegean Islands as far as Crete and Rhodes.
 Marcus Cassianius Latinius Postumus is killed by his own troops, after not allowing them to sack the city of Mogontiacum. 

 Near East 
 Queen Zenobia conquers Syria, Palestine, Lebanon, parts of Mesopotamia and Anatolia and Egypt, giving her control of Rome's grain supply. The library at Alexandria is partly burned during a raid by Zabdas, general of Zenobia.

 By topic 
 Religion 
 January 5 – Pope Felix I succeeds Dionysius as the 26th pope of Rome.
 Paul of Samosata is deposed as Patriarch of Antioch (though he is not removed until 272).

Births 
 Chi Jian (or Daohui), Chinese general (d. 339)
 Murong Hui, Chinese general and politician (d. 333)

Deaths 
 Jingū, Japanese empress and regent (b. 169)
 Justin the Confessor, Christian priest and martyr
 Liu Yin (or Xiuran), Chinese general and administrator
 Lu Kai (or Jingfeng), Chinese general and politician (b. 198)
 Marcus Aurelius Marius, Gallic general and emperor
 Marcus Cassianius Latinius Postumus, Gallic emperor
 Ulpius Cornelius Laelianus, Gallic emperor and usurper
 Wang Xiang (or Xiuzheng), Chinese politician (b. 185)
 Xin Xianying, Chinese noblewoman and advisor (b. 191)

References